George Elliot Dunbar Clyne was Chief Minister of Grenada from March 1961 to August 1961. He became the chief minister following GULP election victory, and stepped down when the political ban of Eric Gairy was lifted. 

Clyne was a lawyer by profession. He was Speaker of the House of Representatives of Grenada from 1967 to 1973. He retired from politics in 1974 and died in November 1984.

See also
List of heads of government of Grenada

References 

20th-century Grenadian lawyers
20th-century Grenadian politicians
Finance ministers of Grenada
Grenada United Labour Party politicians
Speakers of the House of Representatives of Grenada
1984 deaths